is a Japanese football player for Verspah Oita.

Club statistics
Updated to 23 February 2020.

References

External links

Profile at Giravanz Kitakyushu
Profile at FC Ryukyu

1994 births
Living people
Hannan University alumni
Association football people from Fukuoka Prefecture
Japanese footballers
J3 League players
Japan Football League players
FC Ryukyu players
Giravanz Kitakyushu players
Verspah Oita players
Association football forwards